The Norway national ice sledge hockey team is the   national team that represents Norway at international ice sledge hockey competitions. Since 2004, the team has been overseen by the Norwegian Ice Hockey Federation (NIHF) a member of the International Ice Hockey Federation.

Tournament record

Performance in Paralympic Games
1994 –  Silver
1998 –  Gold
2002 –  Silver
2006 –  Silver
2010 –  Bronze

Performance in World Championship
1996 –  Silver
2000 –  Silver
2004 –  Gold
2008 –  Silver
2009 –  Silver

Performance in European Championship
2007 -  Gold
2011 -  Bronze
2016 -  Bronze

Rosters

2011 IPC European Championship roster
#1 Roger Johansen (G), No. 5 Kjell Christian Hamar (G), No. 3 Rolf Einar Pedersen (D), No. 6 Tor Joakim Rivera (F), No. 8 Stig Tore Svee (F), No. 9 Morten Værnes (D), No. 11 Helge Bjørnstad (F), No. 12 Magnus Bøgle (F), No. 16 Knut Andre Nordstoga (F), No. 17 Loyd Remi Johansen (F), No. 21 Ole Bjarte Austevoll (D), No. 22 Audun Bakke (F), No. 23 Jan Roger Klakegg (F), No. 85 Thomas Jacobsen (F).

2010 Paralympics roster

The following is the Norwegian roster in the men's ice sledge hockey tournament of the 2010 Winter Paralympics. A music video with the Norway National Sledge Hockey Team was released in 2010, with the team song "Et halvt bein i finalen" (Half a leg in the final).
 
The team
Roger Johansen, Rolf Einar Pedersen, Kjell Vidar Røyne, Eskil Hagen, Stig Tore Svee, Morten Værnes, Helge Bjørnstad, Tommy Rovelstad, Knut Andre Nordstoga, Loyd Remi Johansen, Kissinger Deng, Ole Bjarte Austevoll, Audun Bakke, Thomas Jacobsen

References

Troppen til Russland (Norwegian), Norwegian Ice Hockey Federation (NIHF)
Uttak til Paralympics 2010 (Norwegian), Norwegian Ice Hockey Federation (NIHF), 13 February 2010 
VM i Tsjekkia 2009, Official site of Norway men's national ice sledge hockey team

External links
 Official site (Norwegian)
 National Sledge Team at the Norwegian Ice Hockey Federation (NIHF)

National ice sledge hockey teams
Ice Sledge Hockey